Grasshopper (born Sean Thomas Mackowiak, May 25 1967) is an American musician with the band Mercury Rev. He has also appeared with Rev side-project Harmony Rockets, his own band Grasshopper and the Golden Crickets, and as a guest musician on numerous other recordings.

Early years
Mackowiak's early years have been colored by a 1991 interview given to music publication Melody Maker, which claimed that he met Rev singer Jonathan Donahue in Camp Sunshine, a reform camp for juvenile delinquents, at the age of ten.

Grasshopper was throwing dead squirrels and rats into a lawnmower when Jonathan met him. The blood spattered over a watching group of retarded kids and they screamed and yelled. They yelled, "Now throw the possum in! The Possum! The possum too!" Muses Jonathan, "When you're younger, these things make a more vivid impression. I remember huge adrenaline rushes as the guts flew and hit people on the legs. I don't know what Grasshopper had done to get in there. He doesn't talk about it much."

The reliability of the story is unknown, though the claim to have met in a reform camp was repeated to the NME in 1998.

Grasshopper was born in upstate New York and was introduced to music by his uncle, an Atlantic Records employee who gave him records by John Coltrane, Ornette Coleman and Miles Davis, as well as novels by Jim Carroll. Growing up close to the border, he was in range of Canadian radio stations, further broadening his musical education.

In the early 80s, Mackowiak was a member of The People's Front (name taken from the Monty Python film Life of Brian), which played concerts in Fredonia, Dunkirk and Buffalo, NY. There was a film made of the band but has since gone missing. The film showed the band in concert and in a mock documentary with the storyline predicting great success not in the US, but "across the pond" in England. The film ends with a crash that was a foreshadowing of the fate that befell the actual guitar player for the group, Kyle Gaszynski.

Grasshopper undertook a BA in the renowned Media Studies program at the State University of New York at Buffalo (1984–1988) where he studied with avant-garde filmmakers Tony Conrad and Paul Sharits as well as Viennese action artist Peter Weibel. He  later received a master's degree in the same subject at The New School, 1990–1993.

While studying at The University of Buffalo around 1986/87, Mackowiak began to play bass guitar with avant garde group Shady Crady, an embryonic Mercury Rev incarnation which also featured Donahue, a member of The Flaming Lips until 1991. Also during his time in Buffalo, he had a relationship with Claudia Zucrow. She previously attended Fiorello H. LaGuardia High School of Music & Art and Performing Arts as a musician, and members of Mercury Rev, The Flaming Lips, and The Goo Goo Dolls have lived with her at different points.

These formative years brought him into close contact with other members of the Flaming Lips/Mercury Rev sphere, such as producer Dave Fridmann and early Rev singer David Baker, also a media student.

Other activities in the late 1980s included working in the video department of a legal transcription company, as a percussionist for the local Buffalo band Sunny in Chernobyl and as a medical research subject: "I did this thing at a medical school where I got paid to take various drugs they were developing. You're in this controlled environment for 3 days and they give you all these drugs then suddenly stop then watch you suffer," he said.

Mackowiak is most commonly known by his childhood nickname Grasshopper, derived from how his family's Polish surname translates into the Polish language - "from where the poppies grow" - and his hyperactive nature as a child.

Mercury Rev

Mercury Rev properly began in 1989, with Grasshopper moving to electric guitar and the band playing along to footage of TV wildlife documentaries. The band's first two albums, Yerself Is Steam (1991) and Boces (1993) were intricate yet deafening soundscapes dominated by the feedback-strewn, heavily effects-processed guitars of Grasshopper and Donahue. The spirit of experimentation was manifested by the band's use of the Tettix Wave Accumulator, a homemade tone generator of Grasshopper's invention. Boces, remembered by the band as a particularly troubled record, was recorded under the influence of the drug rohypnol. When asked by Melody Maker in 1993 what he liked most about the album, Grasshopper replied: "that it's done."

Chaos also manifested itself outside the studio: a legendary, oft-repeated story holds that either Donahue or singer David Baker tried to gouge the guitarist's eye out with a spoon. The band's first UK interview, with the now-defunct Melody Maker in 1991, contained this memorable exchange, reported by Chris Roberts:

I ask Grasshopper's mother, who must be about 50-odd, if she enjoyed the show.

"Oh yes," she beams, "it induced orgasm." I'm sorry? "It induced orgasm."

After 36 hours in the vicinity of Mercury Rev, nothing on earth should throw me. This does. "Can I take your photograph?" she asks. I run away and tell Grasshopper that his band has just sexually aroused his mother. "Uh-huh," he says, like I've just asked him if he wants a beer. "She's kinda cool. And she smokes a lotta dope."

The year 1995, however, saw the departure of Rev singer Baker and a radical change in direction for the band, which drew on Broadway, jazz and doo-wop influences helped along by Grasshopper's clarinet. The album See You on the Other Side, and resulting tour, saw the band virtually ignored.

With Mercury Rev in disintegration and Donahue suffering a breakdown, Grasshopper retreated to a Jesuit Retreat House monastery in Spain. "I was there for six months. Then I left. I mean, you get up at six AM, you make your bed...it was the complete opposite of everything I had been doing for the past six years," he recalled in 1998. Ten years later, he remembered being "pretty scrambled up inside and it just helped me to reflect and to bring some brakes on certain things in my life that were spinning out of control ... For anybody who wants to go there, it's highly recommended. Just step out of reality for a second, empty yourself out, all the baggage."

Between Rev records, he also issued a solo record under the moniker Grasshopper and the Golden Crickets on the Beggars Banquet label. Orbit of Eternal Grace featured several Rev members, home-made electronic instruments and "N.Y. Avenue Playground", effectively a draft of "The Hudson Line", which would appear on the next Mercury Rev album. Around this time, he effected a radical change in appearance by cutting his bottle blond hair into a style which has remained constant since.

Grasshopper was also active in Harmony Rockets, a sprawling Mercury Rev side-project responsible for Willy Wonka theme covers and Paralyzed Mind of the Archangel Void, a full-length LP which contrasted ambient drones alongside full-on noise. "...Paralyzed Mind is nocturnal trance music that never gets monotonous, a stunning feat for a piece this long.... In 2015 we'll be talking about this mercurial, revolutionary CD in the awed tones reserved for The Velvet Underground & Nico, Revolver, A Love Supreme, or Bitches Brew," claimed Alternative Press in 1996.

Reconvening and moving to the Catskill Mountains in these in-between years, the band attempted to record what they deemed likely to be their last chance. The resultant record, Deserter's Songs (1998), was a critical and commercial triumph, leading to an extensive and lengthy tour. With each of the band members in emotionally difficult waters, Grasshopper's contribution on the record drew from the heartfelt death of his uncle. His guitar style, particularly onstage, had evolved from the squalls of the early '90s and was now strongly influenced by the pentatonic blues, albeit retaining an avant-garde edge.

In 2001, Grasshopper was injured in a mugging attack which affected the recording of that year's All Is Dream album:

I was at the Jazz Festival in New Orleans, in this bar watching a Cuban band, with a friend of mine. We were the last ones there. We walked out and we just went around the wrong corner. It happened really fast. There were two guys. They had a gun on my friend and they cut me, and took our wallets. I was bleeding pretty badly. When I went to the hospital, the doctor said, "I don't think this is very good; three of your fingers might be paralyzed."

Making a full recovery, the guitar solo on the track 'Little Rhymes' was played with his arm in a sling. 2005's The Secret Migration was performed under less dramatic circumstances. Preparations for 2008's Snowflake Midnight album included a period of withdrawal from the guitar, as the band explored new directions with the introduction of software-based instrumentation.

Aside from music, Mackowiak's interests include film and modern literature, particularly of the Beat Generation, The Situationists, Minimalism, Fluxus, and Dada. He lives in Kingston, New York with his wife and two young children. Mackowiak is an avid fan of the New York Yankees and frequently posts about them on his Twitter account.

Instruments and musicianship
Grasshopper is nominally the group's lead guitarist, credited in the band's peculiar vocabulary with "guitar shapes"  and "single-exhaust clarinet" in the See You on the Other Side liner notes, and with "guitar reels" and woodwind on Deserter's Songs. The Secret Migration'''s 'Moving On' features prominent singing from him and Jeff Mercel, though 'The Hudson Line', on Deserter's Songs and 'Blood on the Moon' on Lego My Ego feature Grasshopper's only lead vocals with Mercury Rev. He also sings backing vocals live.

He is credited with playing - and inventing - the Tettix Wave Accumulator on various Rev releases, telling Cokemachineglow:

The Tettix Wave Accumulator is basically a huge bank of oscillators, high and low pass filters, and wave shape manipulators. It can use any sound source to manipulate sounds. It also can then sample the manipulated sound and then store the sound on discs. It is still a very wonderful instrument. In 1994, when it was developed, we threw together a bunch of existing technology that hadn't been used together in quite that way before. Now of course, you can achieve many of these sounds with computer programs like Reaktor. The Tettix Wave Accumulator is now housed in the basement of a bar. We were trying to develop a smaller version, but the funds have recently dried up. You could say that Tettix Inc. has been acquired by the Carlyle Group.

"I started out playing clarinet and, I think when I was younger, a lot of my influences were horn players - like Miles Davis, John Coltrane, or John Gillmore, who played with Sun Ra," Grasshopper explained in 2001. "Then as I started playing more and more guitar, as a kid I liked [laughs] The Allman Brothers and Neil Young's guitar playing. Then I got into, obviously, Sterling Morrison of The Velvet Underground, and Tom Verlaine and Richard Lloyd - I love that stuff. I like Robert Quine, who played with Richard Hell, and Lou Reed. I've also got some jazz and punk rock influences, but Tom Verlaine and Richard Lloyd [are the big ones]."

On the 2005 Secret Migration tour, he provided additional harmonica, clarinet and electric piano during guitar-less moments. For the creation of Snowflake Midnight, the band bought MacBooks and experimented with various software packages. "I was very interested in the Native Instruments programs Absynth and FM8 after seeing some demos about them at an electronic music conference I attended in Miami," Grasshopper explained to Cokemachineglow.

His record The Orbit Of Eternal Grace, recorded around 1996 with a loose group dubbed The Golden Crickets, features Grasshopper's vocals, electric, acoustic and bass guitars as well as a Micromoog, Casio PT-30, ENL Synkey, Vox Continental, Mellotron, tape loops, turntables, guitar synth, tone generator, 'rex', alto and tenor saxophones and 'Scotch 201 (1.5mil acetate)' - a type of analogue tape.

He has tended to favour Fender Telecasters since the See You on the Other Side tour, often with customisations such as double humbucker pickups and tremolo arms. These have been decorated with NASA stickers, the logo of the American Revolution Bicentenary (used frequently on album artwork)and stars on the headstock. A Fender Tele-sonic made its appearance on the All Is Dream tour, later acquiring a Bigsby tremolo unit. As the band's sound changed radically with the release of Snowflake Midnight, Grasshopper switched to a hardtail, double-humbucker Fender Jaguar and Yamaha electric guitar.

He and Donahue both used Fender Hotrod DeVille 4x10 combo amplifiers since 1998's Deserter's Songs tour, but switched to comparable Peavey models to tour Snowflake Midnight'' in 2008. A Boss GT6 was added to the already-extensive array of assorted pedals in 2005.

References

External links
Mercury Rev's official website

Silvertone Series #2 Grasshopper and Mercury Rev in Russia. An interview for Podstantsiya.ru

1967 births
American rock guitarists
American male guitarists
Living people
Mercury Rev members
Musicians from Buffalo, New York
20th-century American guitarists
The New School alumni
University at Buffalo alumni